The black-masked finch (Coryphaspiza melanotis) is a species of South American bird in the tanager family Thraupidae. It is the only member of the genus Coryphaspiza. It is found in Argentina, Bolivia, Brazil, Paraguay, and Peru.
Its natural habitats are subtropical or tropical moist shrubland, subtropical or tropical dry lowland grassland, and subtropical or tropical seasonally wet or flooded lowland grassland.
It is threatened by habitat loss.

Taxonomy
The black-masked finch was formally described in 1822 by the Dutch zoologist Coenraad Jacob Temminck under the binomial name Emberizoides melanotis. This species is now placed in the genus Coryphaspiza that was introduced by George Robert Gray in 1840. The type locality is São Paulo, Brazil. The genus name combines the Ancient Greek koruphē meaning "crown of the head" with spiza meaning "finch". The specific epithet melanotis combines the Ancient Greek melas meaning "black" with -ōtis meaning "-eared".

This species was traditionally placed with the buntings and New World sparrows in the subfamily Emberizinae within the family Emberizidae. A molecular phylogenetic study published in 2014 found that the black-masked finch was embedded in the tanager family Thraupidae. Within Thraupidae the black-masked finch is now placed with Embernagra and Emberizoides in the subfamily Emberizoidinae.

Two subspecies are recognised:
 C. m. marajoara Sick, 1967 – Marajó Island (off northeast Brazil)
 C. m. melanotis (Temminck, 1822) – southeast Peru and east Bolivia to east, southeast Brazil, Paraguay and northeast Argentina

References

black-masked finch
Birds of the Bolivian Amazon
Birds of the Cerrado
Birds of Paraguay
black-masked finch
black-masked finch
Taxonomy articles created by Polbot